Rudolf Schmid (21 March 1951 in Liezen - 21 October 2014) was an Austrian luger who competed during the mid-1970s. Teamed with Franz Schachner together they won the bronze medal in the men's doubles event at the 1976 Winter Olympics of Innsbruck.

Schmid also won two bronze medals in the men's doubles event at the FIL World Luge Championships (1974, 1975). He also won two medals at the FIL European Luge Championships with a silver in men's doubles (1970) and a bronze in men's singles (1974).

On 21 October 2014 Schmid was killed in a cycling accident in Oberwart, Austria at the age of 64.   His brother Manfred won the men's singles luge gold at the 1968 Winter Olympics in Grenoble.

References

External links
Death of Rudolf Schmid from FIL site. - accessed 25 October 2014.
DatabaseOlympics.com information on Schmid
Fuzilogik Sports - Winter Olympic results - Men's luge
Hickoksports.com results on Olympic champions in luge and skeleton.
Hickok sports information on World champions in luge and skeleton.
List of European luge champions 

1951 births
2014 deaths
Austrian male lugers
Olympic lugers of Austria
Olympic bronze medalists for Austria
Lugers at the 1972 Winter Olympics
Lugers at the 1976 Winter Olympics
Olympic medalists in luge
Road incident deaths in Austria
Medalists at the 1976 Winter Olympics
People from Liezen District
Sportspeople from Styria